Saarrthi is a Hindi television drama broadcast on Star Plus and produced by Neela Tele Films Private Limited. It aired from 8 November 2004 to 15 February 2008 and contained 708 episodes. The story is a reworking of the Hindu epic, the Mahabharata, detailing the conflict between two brothers and their families in contemporary India.

The drama serial premiered on 9 November 2004 and aired Monday through Thursday. In August 2007, Saarrthi began airing on Fridays as well.

Plot
The story and characters are adapted from Mahabharata which is a story of conflict between two half-brothers—Mansen and Siddhartha (Dhritarashtra and Pandu)-- and their families. The lead, Bhoomika (Subhadra), and her husband Arjun (Arjuna), portray the eternal couple who try to bring peace between the warring families. Along with them is Manasvi (Draupadi) who becomes the center of a conflict between two brothers Satya (Yudhishthira) and Suraj (Karna).While the antagonists are Shifali (Bhanumati), and her husband Yuvraj (Duryodhana).

Cast 
 Neha Devi Singh as Bhoomika  Arjun Goenka  (2004–2007)  
 Karan Grover  as Arjun Goenka  (2004–2007)
 Nawab Shah  as Mansen Goenka  (2004–2008) 
 Manasi Salvi  as Manasvi Goenka  (2004–2006)  
 Rahil Azam  as Suraj Kiran  (2004–2006) 
 Rajesh Shringarpure  as Lord Krishna  (2004–2008) 
 Adita Wahi / Tiya Gandwani as Shefali Yuvraj Goenka  (2004–2006) / (2006–2007)
  Zalak Thakker as Devika Parekh / Bhoomika Goenka  (2007–2008)  
 Gurpreet Singh  as Rudra Singh  (2007–2008)  
 S. M. Zaheer  as Devrath   Goenka  (2004–2008) 
  Micckie Dudaaney as Yuvraj Goenka  (2004–2008) 
 Ashish Kapoor  as Satyajeet   Goenka  (2004–2005)
  Sadhana Singh as Shakuntala Goenka
 Romanchak Arora as Keshav  (2004–2006)  
 Parikshit Sahni  as Hemraj Goenka  (2004–2008)  
 Neena Kulkarni  / Savita Prabhune as  Kumud  Goenka  (2004–2005) / (2005–2008) 
 Shashi Puri  as Siddhartha Goenka  
 Mayank Anand  as Shakti Goenka  (2004)
 Manav Gohil as Shyam (2007)
  Addite Shirwaikar as Vishakha
 Kavita Kaushik
 Kanika Kohli 
 Rajeev Bharadwaj
 Dimple Inamdar
 Kiran Karmarkar as Bhujang Ahuja

References

External links

Official website

Indian television soap operas
StarPlus original programming
2004 Indian television series debuts
2008 Indian television series endings